Alec Bennett (1897–1973) was an Irish-Canadian motorcycle racer famous for motorcycle Grand Prix wins and five career wins at the Isle of Man TT races.

Biography
A native of Craigantlet in Ireland's County Down, Bennett emigrated with his parents to Canada at a very young age. He did not return to the United Kingdom until active duty with the Canadian Expeditionary Force during the First World War when he served as a dispatch rider and later as fighter pilot.  After racing with the works Norton team and also with the factory Sunbeam and Velocette teams, Bennett retired from motorcycle racing in the 1930s to concentrate on his retail motor-trade business in Southampton, Hampshire.

Isle of Man TT Race Career

TT victories

TT career summary

Sources

External links
 TT database rider profile iomtt.com
 TT database TT results iomtt.com

Irish motorcycle racers
Isle of Man TT riders
Irish emigrants to Canada (before 1923)
Canadian Expeditionary Force officers
Canadian people of Ulster-Scottish descent
People from County Down
1897 births
1973 deaths
Canadian World War I pilots